Marta Orellana (born 29 December 1973) is an Argentine middle-distance runner. She competed in the women's 800 metres at the 1996 Summer Olympics.

References

1973 births
Living people
Athletes (track and field) at the 1996 Summer Olympics
Argentine female middle-distance runners
Olympic athletes of Argentina
Place of birth missing (living people)
South American Games gold medalists for Argentina
South American Games bronze medalists for Argentina
South American Games medalists in athletics
Competitors at the 1994 South American Games
Pan American Games medalists in athletics (track and field)
Pan American Games bronze medalists for Argentina
Athletes (track and field) at the 1995 Pan American Games
Medalists at the 1995 Pan American Games
20th-century Argentine women